Always a Bride is a 1953 British comedy film directed by Ralph Smart and starring Peggy Cummins, Terence Morgan and Ronald Squire. The film's sets were designed by Maurice Carter.

Plot
A British father and daughter work a confidence trick up and down the luxury hotels of the French Riviera by posing as a newly married couple. Trouble begins, however, when the daughter falls in love with a tax investigator.

Cast
 Peggy Cummins as Clare Hemsley 
 Terence Morgan as Terence Winch
 Ronald Squire as Victor Hemsley
 James Hayter as Dutton
 Marie Lohr as Dowager
 Geoffrey Sumner as Teddy
 David Hurst as Beckstein
 Sebastian Cabot as Taxi Driver
 Charles Goldner as Hotel Manager
 Jacques B. Brunius as Inspector
 Jill Day as Singer
 Jacques Brown as Manager 
 Dino Galvani as Magistrate 
 Mary Hinton as Dowager
 Eliot Makeham as Roger, Hotel Guest 
 Martin Benson as Hotel Desk Clerk
 Robert Rietti as Inspector

References

Bibliography
 Mayer, Geoffrey. Guide to British Cinema. Greenwood Publishing Group, 2003.

External links

1953 films
1953 comedy films
British comedy films
Films about con artists
Films set in France
Films directed by Ralph Smart
Films scored by Benjamin Frankel
Films shot at Pinewood Studios
British black-and-white films
1950s English-language films
1950s British films